NABE may refer to:
National Association for Bilingual Education
National Association for Business Economics
Nabe or nabemono, Japanese steamboat dishes